Chilton is a village and civil parish in the Vale of White Horse about  southwest of Didcot. The parish was part of Berkshire until the 1974 local government boundary changes transferred the Vale of White Horse to Oxfordshire. The 2011 Census recorded the parish population as 894. The village is just off the A34 road.

History
A section of the Grim's Ditch forms part of the southern boundary of the parish.  The prehistoric Ridgeway National Trail passes south of the village.  The Domesday Book of 1086 lists the parish. In 1644 the village was the site of a minor incident following the Second Battle of Newbury in which Parliamentarians narrowly escaped being attacked by Royalists. The Church of England parish church of All Saints dates from the 12th century. Since 1976 the ecclesiastical parish has been united with Harwell. The southern part of the Harwell Science and Innovation Campus, including the Rutherford Appleton Laboratory, is in the parish.

References

Sources

External links

The Parish of St Matthew's Harwell with All Saints' Chilton: All Saints' Chilton
Chilton Primary School
Directory of websites including content about Chilton

Civil parishes in Oxfordshire
Vale of White Horse
Villages in Oxfordshire